A syllabic consonant or vocalic consonant is a consonant that forms a syllable on its own, like the m, n and l in some pronunciations of the English words rhythm, button and bottle. To represent it, the understroke diacritic in the International Phonetic Alphabet is used, .

Syllabic consonants in most languages are sonorants, such as nasals and liquids. Very few have syllabic obstruents, such as stops and fricatives in normal words, but English has syllabic fricatives in paralinguistic words like shh! and zzz.

Examples

Germanic languages

In many varieties of High and Low German, pronouncing syllabic consonants may be considered a shibboleth. In High German and Tweants (a Low Saxon dialect spoken in the Netherlands; more Low Saxon dialects have the syllabic consonant), all word-final syllables in infinite verbs and feminine plural nouns spelled  are pronounced with syllabic consonants. The High German infinitive  ('to walk') is pronounced  or (in some accents) even  and its Tweants counterpart  is pronounced . Tweants scholars even debate whether or not this feature should be incorporated in spelling, resulting in two generally accepted spelling forms (either  or ).

Many dialects of English may use syllabic consonants in words such as even , awful  and rhythm , which English dictionaries' respelling systems usually treat as realizations of underlying sequences of schwa and a consonant.

In Danish, a syllabic consonant is the standard colloquial realization of combinations of the phoneme schwa  and a sonorant, generally referred to as schwa-assimilation, e.g.

In all four dialect groups of Norwegian, a syllabic alveolar nasal, may be heard. It is syllabic when following other alveolar consonants and occurs most often in the definite singular form of masculine nouns (see Norwegian grammar) where the schwa has elided, e.g. ('the car') , where it was originally . With some speakers, the schwa may be reinserted, especially for words already ending in  where the syllabic  may have been entirely elided afterward, e.g. This syllabification of alveolar nasals also appears in some Swedish dialects. In all cases where the alveolar sound becomes retroflex,  also becomes retroflex , e.g. ('the moustache')  (see Norwegian phonology#Consonants). In some Norwegian dialects, a syllabic alveolar lateral approximant  may be heard in the same circumstances as syllabic , e.g. ('poodle') , though it is not as common as syllabic . A syllabic  may also be heard in Bergen, where a following syllabic  has elided completely, e.g. ('the sun') . In dialects that have palatalisation of some alveolar consonants like Northern Norwegian and Trøndersk, the following syllabic  is also palatalised, e.g. ('the ball') .

Obstruents
All of the consonants syllabicized in Germanic languages are sonorants.  However, the only time obstruents are used syllabically in English is in onomatopoeia, such as sh!  (a command to be quiet), sss  (the hiss of a snake), zzz  (the sound of a bee buzzing or someone sleeping), and tsk tsk!  (used to express disapproval or pity), though it is not certain how to define what a syllable is in such cases.

Sanskrit
This continues the reconstructed situation of Proto-Indo-European, where both liquids and nasals had syllabic allophones, .

Slavic languages
Many Slavic languages allow syllabic consonants. Some examples include:
 Czech and Slovak r  and l , as in the phrase  'stick your finger through the throat' (in both languages). Slovak also has long versions of these syllabic consonants, ŕ and ĺ, e.g.:   'joint',   'willow',   '(of) spots'. Czech also has m̩ and n̩, e.g.:   'seven'.
Vltava.
 Serbo-Croatian r , such as in  'to run'; l , such as in  'Vltava'; and n , such as in  'Newton'. In dialects between the Kupa river and Velebit of pre-war Croatia, other consonants are also syllabic.
 Macedonian р , such as in   'first',   'heart',    'irrepressible',   'spine',   'to rust',   'to snore', etc.

Sinitic languages
Several Sinitic languages, such as Cantonese and Hokkien, feature both syllabic m and ng that stand alone as their own words.

Syllabic fricatives
A number of languages have syllabic fricatives or fricative vowels. In several varieties of Chinese, certain high vowels following fricatives or affricates are pronounced as extensions of those sounds, with voicing added (if not already present) and a vowel pronounced while the tongue and teeth remain in the same position as for the preceding consonant, leading to the turbulence of a fricative carrying over into the vowel. Traditional grammars describe them as having a "buzzing" sound. A number of modern linguists describe them as true syllabic fricatives, although with weak frication and voicing. They are accordingly transcribed  respectively.

However, for many speakers, the friction carries over only into the beginning of the vowel. The tongue and teeth remain where they were, but the tongue contact is lessened a bit to allow for a high approximant vowel with no frication except at the beginning, during the transition. John Wells<ref>John Wells (March 15, 2007). "Chinese apical vowels . John Wells's phonetic blog. Some speakers have even more lax articulation, opening the teeth and noticeably lowering the tongue, so that  are pronounced , with the same vowel  in each case and no r-coloring.

The Nuosu language has two similar "buzzed" vowels that are described as syllabic fricatives, . The former may even be trilled .

Sinologists and linguists working in the Chinese analytical tradition frequently use the term apical vowel to describe the sounds above and others like them in various Sino-Tibetan languages. However, this is a misnomer, as the tongue is actually laminal. The term apical vowel should also not be taken as synonymous with syllabic fricative, as e.g., the bilabial syllabic fricative  in Liangshan Yi is not pronounced with the tongue.

Other languages
Berber, Salish, Wakashan and Chemakuan languages have syllabic obstruents in normal vocabulary, such as Nuxálk ,  "northeast wind",  'wet',  'dry', or  'we used to sing'.

In Standard Yoruba, the consonants m and n may be syllabic and carry tone like vowels. However, they always stand alone as syllables and cannot stand as syllable nuclei.

In Baoulé, m or n'' may be syllabic. As a stand-alone word, it means 'I' (first person subject pronoun), as in   'I speak Baoulé'. Its quality varies with the consonant following it, as in   'I will come tomorrow'.

The Hungarian word  , a high-register variant of  'and', is a syllabic consonant, although it usually cliticises:    'and I had eaten'.

See also
  N with long right leg

References

Vowels
Consonants
Phonotactics